, also known as “Keio SFC” is a research-oriented campus of Keio University located in the city of Fujisawa, Kanagawa Prefecture, Japan. The campus currently offers three undergraduate courses and two postgraduate courses, and incorporates one high school and several research institutes. The campus was designed by Fumihiko Maki, a Pritzker Prize laureate.

History
Keio Gijuku (public school) was founded by Fukuzawa Yukichi in 1858 in downtown Tokyo. The subsidiary Keio University Shonan Fujisawa Campus opened in 1990, starting with the Faculty of Policy Management(The first dean was Hiroshi Katou.) and Faculty of Environmental Information(The first dean was Hideo Aiso). This was expanded in 1991 with the establishment of three Research Institutes (Policy Management, Environmental Information, and Language Communication).

In addition to the university, the Shonan Fujisawa Junior and Senior High Schools were added in 1992, and a graduate school for Media and Governance in 1994. The Keio Research Institute was opened in 1996. In 2001, the school added a Faculty of Nursing and Medical Care, followed by a teacher training course in 2002. A graduate school of Health Management was started in 2005.

Schools

Faculty of Policy Management
Faculty of Environment and Information Studies
Faculty of Nursing and Medical Care
Graduate School of Media and Governance
Graduate School of Health Management
Keio Shonan-Fujisawa Junior & Senior High School

Research institutes
The Keio Research Institute at SFC (KRIS)

Other Facilities
Keio Fujisawa Innovation Village SFC-IV

People
Faculty

Jun Murai: founder of JUNET and president of  WIDE Project
Heizo Takenaka: economist, former politician (member of Koizumi Cabinet)
Fumihiko Maki: Pritzker Prize Laureate
Shirō Asano : former governor of Miyagi Prefecture
Hiroshi Shimizu: project leader of Eliica
 Takeshi Natsuno: creator of i-mode
 Shunji Yamanaka: designer of Nissan Infiniti Q45, Suica
 Naoki Sakai: designer of Nissan Be-1
Naoyuki Agawa: a Japanese lawyer, diplomat, academic and author
 Jimbo Ken
Alumni
Yukari Yoshihara: Go professional
Gaku Hashimoto: Japanese politician
Kreva (rapper)
Asami Konno: member of JPop group Morning Musume
Yo Hitoto: JPop singer, songwriter
Hiro Mizushima: actor, model
Masahiro Yanagida: athlete, Japan men's national volleyball team #8

Location
The nearest train station is Shonandai Station, which is about 45 minutes away from Shinjuku. Almost all of the students take a bus from the station, as the campus is approximately 3 kilometers away.

Reference

See also
Keio University

External links

Keio University Shonan Fujisawa Campus (SFC)
Academic Organizations Related to SFC
WIDE project
WIDE University
Keio SFC Global Campus

Shonan Fujisawa Campus
Universities and colleges in Kanagawa Prefecture
Educational institutions established in 2004
Private universities and colleges in Japan
Fumihiko Maki buildings
Buildings and structures in Fujisawa, Kanagawa
2004 establishments in Japan